Up the Down Staircase is a 1967 American drama film directed by Robert Mulligan and starring Oscar winners Sandy Dennis and Eileen Heckart, along with
Patrick Bedford and Jean Stapleton. The plot concerns the first, trying assignment for a young, idealistic teacher. Tad Mosel wrote the screenplay adaptation of the novel of the same name by Bel Kaufman. This was one of two last films, along with The Family Way, released by Warner Bros. Pictures before the company was rebranded as Warner Bros.-Seven Arts in July 1967.

Plot
The film's title is a reference to the staircases inside a public, overcrowded New York City high school of 3,000 students of various races and ethnicities, many of whom are troubled and disadvantaged; a few are gang members. Sylvia Barrett, fresh out of graduate school, has just been hired to teach English but is disheartened by the school's burdensome regulations, daily reporting and other paperwork. Her students are often disruptive and undisciplined. The students include Alice, who has a crush on a male teacher and narrowly avoids death after jumping out a school window; Linda, who is physically abused by her father; Joe, who is on court probation and has a high I.Q. but a mixed academic record, testing Sylvia's patience; and Roy, who works nights and falls asleep in class. Some of the teaching staff have an antagonistic relationship with the students and disagree with Sylvia's calm, quiet approach, but she intends to infuse the students with learning and skills to succeed after high school. She finally succeeds in engaging her students in a lively discussion about classic literature (comparing "the best of times ... the worst of times" to their own lives), followed by a lively mock trial, as she ponders and ultimately decides against resignation.

Cast

Sandy Dennis as Sylvia Barrett, English teacher
Patrick Bedford as Paul Barringer, English teacher and unpublished writer
Eileen Heckart as Henrietta Pastorfield, English teacher
Ruth White as Beatrice Schachter, teacher and soon Miss Barrett's mentor
Jean Stapleton as Sadie Finch, school office staff
Sorrell Booke as Dr. Bester, school principal
Roy Poole as Mr McHabe, school vice-principal
Florence Stanley as Ella Friedenberg, guidance counselor
Vinnette Carroll as The Mother; student Roy Atkins' guardian, Mrs. Lewes
Frances Sternhagen as Charlotte Wolf, school librarian

Production
 
Sandy Dennis took the role of Sylvia Barrett after winning an Academy Award for Best Supporting Actress for her performance in Who's Afraid of Virginia Woolf?

The film was entered into the 5th Moscow International Film Festival, at which Dennis won the award for Best Actress.

Outdoor street scenes were filmed on 1st Ave. and East 100th Street in East Harlem. The outdoor school scenes were filmed on the same block at Julia de Burgos Junior High School 99 at 410 East 100th St. (now the Renaissance Charter High School for Innovation). Some indoor school and classroom scenes were filmed at the former Haaren High School on 59th St. and 10th Ave. (today's John Jay College of Criminal Justice) and at a production studio in Chelsea.

Filming took place during the summer of 1966 during a record-breaking heat wave in New York City. Outdoor scenes depicting snowstorms were actually filmed while the temperature was as high as 95 °F.

The actors portraying the students were non-professionals, and most were high-school students themselves. Jeff Howard, 20 years old, was a Long Island University student. Jose Rodriguez, the quiet student who blossoms during the trial sequence, was a 17-year-old student at the New York School of Printing, now the High School of Graphic Communication Arts. Ellen O'Mara, who plays a lovestruck student, was also 17 and attended Washington Irving High School (now known as the Washington Irving Campus). Salvatore Rasa, playing the student-body president of the fictional high school, was 17 and had that role in real life at Bishop Ford High School.

Reception
In a contemporary review, New York Times critic Bosley Crowther wrote: "For the most part, this is a beautifully balanced, fluid film, with engrossing contemporary material and excellent performances." He praised Dennis's performance, writing that she "... walks away with the show, giving a vivid performance of emotional range and depth. Her beaming enthusiasms, her startled hesitations, her grave alarms, her humors and indignations and her air of intense sincerity acquaint us with a genuine, loving person we can believe wants to find her pupils' wounds and, what's more, try to heal them – which she can't, and that's the sadness of it all."

Los Angeles Times critic Charles Champlin called the film a "very, very, very good movie" and wrote: "It is at once warm and chilling, tough and sentimental, greatly moving, notably honest, improvisationally fresh, wryly and ribaldly funny, disturbing yet infused with a quantity of optimism no larger than the human heart. It is a work of fiction with the feeling of a documentary, in the best sense of giving us real insights into ourselves and others."

Champlin and others noted the striking similarities between Up the Down Staircase and To Sir, with Love, films released within one month of each other. He wrote: "The accents are different, but, obviously, antiquated school buildings, inadequate budgets and despairing faculty are ironic common bonds with our ally across the Atlantic. The problems and resolutions are remarkably similar on both sides of the ocean, bespeaking nothing more and nothing less than the universality of the problems. ... What finally unifies them is their joint indictment of pedagogic attitudes which push methods and merchandise so unrelated to students' real interests and needs as to spark only rebellion or apathy."

On Rotten Tomatoes, the film holds a rating of 78% from 41 reviews.

See also
 List of teachers portrayed in films

References

External links

 

1967 films
American coming-of-age drama films
American high school films
Films based on American novels
1960s coming-of-age drama films
Films directed by Robert Mulligan
Films about educators
Films about juvenile delinquency
Films about teacher–student relationships
Films scored by Fred Karlin
Films set in New York City
Films shot in New York City
1960s high school films
Warner Bros. films
Films set in New York (state)
Films shot in New York (state)
1967 drama films
1960s English-language films
1960s American films